Chanthaburi is a town (thesaban mueang) in the east of Thailand, on the banks of the Chanthaburi River. It is the capital of the Chanthaburi Province and the Mueang Chanthaburi District.

The town covers the two tambons Talat and Wat Mai of Mueang Chanthaburi District. As of 2005, the town had a population of 27,602. The town figures in the legacy of King Taksin. In 1981 the Thai cabinet passed a resolution to bestow on him the honorary title of the Great. When the Bank of Thailand issued the 12th Series of banknotes, called  The Great Series, the monument of King Taksin the Great in the town's Tungnachaey recreational park appeared on the back of the 20 baht note issued 28 December 1981, the 214th anniversary of his coronation.

Climate
Chanthaburi has a tropical monsoon climate (Köppen climate classification Am), with little variation in temperature throughout the year. Rainfall, however, varies dramatically by season. Rainfall is light and infrequent in the short dry season (December to February), but the wet season (April to October) features torrential rain. March and November are transitional months, during which significant rainfall may occur in some years, while in other years little rain falls.

The Cathedral of the Immaculate Conception, the principal church of the Roman Catholic Diocese of Chanthaburi, is the largest church in Thailand.

Transportation
Route 3 (Sukhumvit Road) passes near Chanthaburi and connects to city to Rayong, Pattaya, Chonburi, and Bangkok to the northwest and Trat to the southeast. Route 317 connects Chanthaburi to Sa Kaeo.

References

External links

 
Populated places in Chanthaburi province